Tazewell High School (THS) is a public secondary school in Tazewell, Virginia, United States.  It is part of Tazewell County Public Schools and is located on 627 Fincastle Road. As of the 2007-2008 school year, enrollment is around 500 students.

History

Prior to the current location, Tazewell High School was located in three other areas: the current locations of the Tazewell County Courthouse, the Tazewell branch of the Tazewell County Library, and the Tazewell County Administration Building.

The current location was built in 1954. As the town grew and changed, so did the school. By 1975, increased enrollment prompted the addition of a new science and library wing, an elevator, and assorted other classrooms. The grounds were also altered with the construction of a football field, regulation track, two field houses, a baseball field, a picnic area, a memorial to John F. Kennedy, several parking lots, and tennis courts.

The school colors were originally purple and gold, but were later changed to kelly green and white. The Bulldog becomes the THS mascot in 1926.

As students needs changed, so did the curriculum at Tazewell High School. Class offerings expanded to keep up with developments in education and technology, while a variety of extracurricular activities -including athletics, clubs, drama, and music- gave young people new avenues by which to explore their talents and interests.

Today the school serving as the site for public meetings, cultural events, athletic meets, academic competitions, and assorted student-centered programs. From the beginning of Tazewell County in 1799, education plays an important role in the lives of Tazewell’s young citizens. Through home instruction and the basics of reading, writing, and arithmetic, Tazewell Countians recognize the importance of education. The isolation of Tazewell County, however, makes it difficult during the early history of the county to get competent teachers to provide instruction to its children. The first free public school system was established by the Virginia General Assembly in 1850. Even by this time, however, many Virginia residents look upon this new public school system as a form of government charity. Therefore, public education is not very successful in any section of the commonwealth. Private schools, for those who can afford them, continue to play the major role in schooling for many of Virginia’s young people.

The Virginia Constitution of 1870, also known as the Underwood Constitution, finally establishes universal, free public education in the Commonwealth. Tazewell High School was established in October 1872. The first term at THS was completed in the spring of 1873 with a small student body. Professor A. D. Walthall was the first principal. Mrs. O. E. Witten, Mrs. J. L. P. Spotts, and Miss Louisa Todd Coulling were the first teachers. The original school board was made up of W. W. Peery, A. J. May, Isaac E. Chapman, George W. Gillespie, Zachariah S. Witten, A. J. Tynes, and Jonathan Lyons. The first graduating class completed their course of studies in the spring of 1879. The principal this year is W. A. Evans. Graduation ceremonies are held on June 14, 1879. The commencement exercises are known as "exhibitions" during these early years. During this first decade the school term runs for five months and the four teachers on the staff are paid a salary of $20.00 per month. Subjects offered during this period include advanced studies such as trigonometry, astronomy, and calculus. Classes during the early years of the school’s existence were housed in the Tazewell County Courthouse. Professor W. A. Evans was named the second principal at THS.
In 1894 Tazewell High School was under the direction of a new principal, Mr. George C. Peery, who later became the Governor of the Commonwealth of Virginia. Peery served only two years as principal; he resigns to attend law school at Washington and Lee School of Law. By the middle of the 1890s the enrollment at THS reached 75 students. THS also established its first band by 1898.

Interscholastic sports competition features basketball with teams from Tazewell High School competing with such schools as Witten’s Mill and Burkes Garden on outdoor dirt courts. In 1909 the old bank building which housed Tazewell High School was torn down to make way for a new school structure. This new building was first occupied on August 19, 1909, and included both elementary and high school students.

During the first decade of the 1900s Tazewell High School’s student magazine, The Pep, was born. The magazine contained student written literary essays, students' news, and even a gossip column. Harriet Scott served as one of the first editors. The daily recess routine at THS consisted of lining the entire student body up two by two in front of the high school building on Main Street. Next the group marched down Fincastle Turnpike around the bend to the intersection with Carline (Tazewell Avenue). The students then proceeded down the avenue, then up Pine Street, and back to the high school.

Social life at the school centered on parties that were held at the high school building. Students danced the Waltz, the "Turkey Trot", and the "One Step". At the high school, students danced in the long hallway on the third floor of the building. Students also danced in a large room located above Greever Hardware and another hall located in the building across the street from the Bank of Clinch Valley. In December of each year, the third floor hallway at THS is the location for a Christmas bazaar sponsored by several different community groups.

Thirteen students graduated Tazewell High School in the class of 1919. All 13 students took part in the ceremony; playing the piano, speaking, or singing. At the end of the ceremony the younger students walked to the stage and presented the graduates with gifts consisting of wrapped packages or flowers. Mr. Carson was the principal at Tazewell High School. The salary schedule for teachers in Tazewell County during this decade varies from $30.00 to $50.00 per month depending on the teaching certificate held.

Nationally known evangelist, Billy Sunday, spoke to the THS student body on May 23, 1923. Dr. Charles J. Smith, president of Roanoke College, delivered a "literary address" to graduates on May 25, 1923. Graduation for the class of 1923 is held Friday, May 27, with 17 students graduating. Tazewell High School's mascot is created by the first football coach Homes "Pard" Byrd in 1926. Byrd is a recent graduate of Emory and Henry College. His favorite football team is the Georgia Bulldogs, so he decides to name his team the Bulldogs.
 
When the local newspapers began writing articles on the boys, they referred to them as the Bull Dogs. Later, the words are combined to create "Bulldogs." In 1926, the school colors were purple and gold because the uniforms that are donated to the team are these colors. According to unofficial records, Tazewell's football team was created because Richlands is also establishing a team. Tazewell High students played their first interscholastic football game in the fall of 1926 against a team from Council in Buchanan County, Virginia. This first game was won by the Bulldogs by a score of 12-0 over "Triangle Mountain Institute." Other wins during the inaugural year included 14-0 over Bramwell, 6-0 over Richlands, and a win over Graham. The overall record of this first football squad (1926) was 4-4. In 1929, maroon and white uniforms were given to the Dogs, as a result, THS's first school colors become maroon and white. A November 16, 1929 football game pitted Tazewell's maroon and white team against Bluefield High School in a Saturday morning game played at the Wade Field in Bluefield.

Graduation for the class of 1929 was held on Tuesday, May 29. Tazewell High School received its first official accreditation from the Association of Colleges and Secondary Schools of the Southern States on Friday, June 7, 1929. Appalachia High School, Galax High School, Saltville High School, Troutville High School, and Wise High School joined THS and a total of 62 Virginia high schools out of the 408 high schools in the state which achieve accreditation standards by the 1928-1929 school term. The Bulldogs won a state football championship in football in 1986, defeating Nottoway 16-7.

Notable alumni
 Kathryn Harrold, actress 
 Francis A. Hopkins, US representative from Kentucky 
 Billy Wagner, 1990 MLB baseball player
 George Grimes, NFL Football player, 1948 Detroit Lions

Traditions

 "The Rock" - Every year, the THS Senior Class paints The Rock. The Rock is located beside the school's tennis courts. Each year the seniors choose two or three main colors to represent their class on the rock.  The seniors then spend one day painting the background of the rock one color, and the next painting their year of graduation and names on it. This is kept on the rock until the next year's senior class repeats the tradition.
 "The Seal Ceremony" - At each year's spring Awards Assembly, the final event is the transferring of the school seal from officers of the graduating class to officers of the junior class. The presentation is effectively dramatized by the use of hand-held objects which replicate the items found in the seal.
 "The Peak" - Since the establishment of THS in 1952, students have taken an annual climb to the Peak. It is because of these yearly "pilgrimages" that the students have formed such a close bond with our mountain. This was later stopped because it was said to be unsafe and because there is now a private owner.

Fight song
"It's Tazewell High School, it's Tazewell High School,
The pride of every student here,
Come on old grads, come join us young lads,
It's Tazewell High School now we cheer,
And now it's time boys, to make a big noise,
No matter what the people say,
There's none to fear, the gang's all here,
so hail Tazewell High School hail!"

Alma mater

Where mountains stand so boldly

Where skies are always bright

Our Alma Mater lifts her head

And sings her strength and might

We lift our eyes unto the hills

That shelter Tazewell High

They give us strength to love and serve

The school whose fame we cry

Oh, Tazewell High, we love thee

Alma Mater dear

For you we stand and sing our song

Of praise for all to hear

We love thee Tazewell High School

Your light forever shines

It shines to guide and keep me near

That dear old school of mine.

Trivia

 The Tazewell High School fight song played by the THS Marching Bulldog Band has the same melody as the fight song from West Virginia University.
 A memorial plaque dedicated to former President of the United States, John F. Kennedy, is located outside of the school.

References

External links
 Tazewell High School website
 History of Tazewell High School
 Virginia school report card for THS

Educational institutions established in 1954
Public high schools in Virginia
Schools in Tazewell County, Virginia
1954 establishments in Virginia